
This is a list of aircraft in numerical order of manufacturer followed by alphabetical order beginning with 'M'.

Mk

MKEK 
(Turkish: Makina ve Kimya Endüstrisi Kurumu – Mechanical and Chemical Industry Corporation)
 MKEK-1 Gözcü (Turkish – "Observer")
 MKEK-2 
 MKEK-3
 MKEK-4 Uğur (Turkish: "Luck")
 MKEK-5
 MKEK-6
 MKEK-7

References

Further reading

External links 

 List of Aircraft (M)

fr:Liste des aéronefs (I-M)